Buck is the nickname of the following people (for fictional characters, see Buck):

Notable in multiple fields
Lynn Compton (1921–2012), lead prosecutor in Sirhan Sirhan's trial for the assassination of Robert F. Kennedy, California Court of Appeals judge and World War II officer portrayed in the HBO miniseries Band of Brothers
Robert Halperin (1908–1985), American co-founder of the Lands' End clothing retailer, sailor, National Football League quarterback and US Navy officer during World War II

In sports

American football
Buck Gurley (born 1978), American former National Football League (NFL) player
Buck Jones (American football) (1888–1985), Native American NFL player during the 1922 season
Frank "Buck" O'Neill (1875–1958), American college football player and Hall-of-Fame coach, also a sprinter
Buck Shaw (1899–1977), American college football player and NFL head coach

Baseball
Harry Buckner (1876–1938), American baseball pitcher and outfielder in the Negro leagues
Les Burke (1902–1975), American Major League Baseball (MLB) player
Buck Freeman (1871–1949), American MLB outfielder
Buck Freeman (pitcher) (1896–1953), American MLB right-handed pitcher
Jerry Freeman (1879–1952), American MLB first baseman
Buck Jordan (1907–1993), American MLB player
Buck Leonard (1907–1997), American baseball player in the Negro leagues, member of the Baseball Hall of Fame
Buck Martinez (born 1948), American former MLB player and coach
Frank McCormick (1911–1982), American MLB player
Buck O'Neil (1911–2006), American baseball player and manager in the Negro leagues
Buck Pressly (1886–1954), American baseball player and manager in the minor leagues
Lee Rogers (baseball) (1913–1995), American MLB pitcher in the 1938 season
Buck Rodgers (born 1938), American former MLB catcher and manager
Buck Showalter (born 1956), American MLB manager and former player
Zack Wheat (1888–1982), American MLB player, member of the Baseball Hall of Fame
Kirby White (1884–1943), American MLB pitcher
Jesse Winters (1893–1986), American MLB pitcher

Rugby
Denzil Jones (1926–2010), Welsh rugby union and rugby league footballer
Buck Shelford (born 1957), New Zealand former rugby union footballer and coach

Other
Buck Baker (1919–2002), American race car driver, member of the NASCAR Hall of Fame
Buck Brannaman (born 1962), American horse trainer
Buck Canel (1906–1980), American sportscaster
Alvin Jones (ice hockey) (1917–2007), Canadian National Hockey League player
Peter Stewart (cricketer) (1730–1796), English cricketer
Buck White (golfer) (1911–1982), American golfer

Military officers
Albert Elton, retired United States Air Force major general
Elliott Buckmaster (1889–1977), US Navy vice admiral and aviator
William F. Kernan (born 1946), US Army retired general
Charles T. Lanham (1902–1978), US Army major general, friend of Ernest Hemingway and model for one of the writer's heroes
William McCandless (1834–1884), Union Army colonel who fought in the American Civil War
Buck McNair (1919-1971), Canadian Second World War flying ace
Charles C. Pattillo (1924-2019), American Air Force lieutenant general
Jonathan Rogers (GC) (1920–1964), Welsh-born Royal Australian Navy sailor awarded the George Cross
Donald Schmuck (1915–2004), US Marine Corps brigadier general
Earl Van Dorn (1820–1863), US Army officer and American Civil War Confederate Army general

In music
Buck Clarke (1934–1988), American jazz percussionist
Buck Clayton (1911–1991), American jazz trumpeter
Josh Graves (1927–2006), American bluegrass musician
Buck Owens (1929–2006), American country musician
Buck Ram (1907–1991), American songwriter and music producer
Buck Dharma (1947–present), American songwriter and guitarist

Politicians and lawyers
Ulysses S. Grant, Jr. (1852-1929), American attorney and entrepreneur, second son of President Ulysses S. Grant
Constantine B. Kilgore (1835–1897), American politician
Buck Rinehart (1946-2015), mayor of Columbus, Ohio (1984–1992)
William M. Walton (1832–1915), American lawyer, Attorney General of Texas, politician and Confederate Army major
Thomas Whaley (politician) (1765–1800), Irish gambler and politician

Criminals
Buck Barrow (1903–1933), member of the Barrow Gang, older brother of Clyde Barrow (of Bonnie and Clyde fame)
Buck English (died 1915), American Old West outlaw

Other
Buck Choquette (1830–1898), French-Canadian prospector who made the 1861 gold strike which led to the Stikine Gold Rush
James Buchanan Duke (1856–1925), American industrialist and philanthropist for whom Duke University is named
David Paul Grove (born 1958), Canadian actor and voice actor
Buck Jones (1891–1942), American actor, stuntman and cowboy
Buck Angel (born 1962), American adult film actor and producer and motivational speaker
Michael Buckley (Internet celebrity) (born 1975), American Internet celebrity, comedian and vlogger
Jacob Lowe, star of the TV series Mountain Monsters

See also 

 
 
Old Buck (disambiguation)
Bucks (disambiguation)
Bucky (disambiguation)

Lists of people by nickname